Meletius was Greek Orthodox Patriarch of Jerusalem (1731–1737). He was born in Turkey.

18th-century Greek Orthodox Patriarchs of Jerusalem
Bishops in the Ottoman Empire
Year of birth unknown
Year of death unknown